228th may refer to:

228th Battalion (Northern Fusiliers), CEF, a unit in the Canadian Expeditionary Force during the First World War
228th Combat Communications Squadron (228 CBCS) is an Air National Guard combat communications unit at McGhee-Tyson ANGB, Tennessee
228th Infantry Brigade (United Kingdom), formed in both the First and Second World Wars
Toronto 228th Battalion (NHA), an ice hockey team, composed entirely of troops in the 228th (Northern Fusiliers) Battalion, CEF of the Canadian Army

See also
228 (number)
228, the year 228 (CCXXVIII) of the Julian calendar
228 BC